Peaugres is a commune in the Ardèche department in southern France.

Population

See also
Safari de Peaugres
Communes of the Ardèche department

References

Communes of Ardèche
Ardèche communes articles needing translation from French Wikipedia